Silver Rain is an album by bassist Marcus Miller. Named after a poem by Langston Hughes, it was released in 2005.

Track listing
All compositions by Marcus Miller, except as noted.
 "Intro Duction" – 	0:30
 "Bruce Lee" – 	5:23
 "La Villette" (Miller, Lalah Hathaway) – 	5:54
 "Behind The Smile" – 	6:24
 "Frankenstein" (Edgar Winter) – 	6:33
 "Moonlight Sonata" (Ludwig van Beethoven) – 	7:38
 "Boogie On Reggae Woman" (Stevie Wonder) – 	5:02
 "Paris (Interlude)" – 	1:14
 "Silver Rain" (Miller, Eric Clapton, Joey Kibble, Bill Withers) – 	6:08
 "Make Up My Mind" – 	3:42
 "Girls and Boys" (Prince) – 	5:36
 "Sophisticated Lady" (Duke Ellington, Irving Mills, Mitchell Parish) – 	5:23
 "Power of Soul" (Jimi Hendrix) – 	6:53
 "Outro Duction" –     0:53
 "If Only For One Night" (Brenda Russell) -> "Silver Rain (reprise)" –   8:11

Personnel
Marcus Miller – Organ, Synthesizer, Bass, Percussion, Piano, Scratching, Arranger, Clarinet (Bass), Drums, Keyboards, Tambourine, Vocals (background), Moog Synthesizer, Producer, Engineer, Fretless Bass, Woodwind, Executive Producer, Bass (Acoustic), Beat Box, Fender Rhodes, Rhythm Box, Synthesizer Orchestration, Finger Snapping, Udu, Synthesizer Strings
Poogie Bell – Drums (tracks 3-7, 9, 13 & 15)
Dean Brown – Acoustic and Electric guitar (tracks 3-6, 9, 11, 13 & 15)
Roger Byam – Tenor saxophone (tracks 5-6, 9, 11, 13 & 15; credited as soloist on track 6)
Bruce Flowers – Organ, Fender Rhodes, Synthesizer Bass (tracks 5, 9, 13, 15)
Patches Stewart – Trumpet (track 2, 5-6, 9, 11, 13, 15)
Bernard Wright – Keyboards (tracks 2-3, 6, 13)

Guests
Gerald Albright - Alto saxophone (track 2)
Ronald Bruner – Drums (track 11)
Jessica Celious – background vocals (track 9)
Eric Clapton – Vocals, Guitar solo (track 9)
Kenny Garrett – Alto saxophone, Soloist (tracks 9, 11)
Macy Gray – Vocals (track 11)
Lalah Hathaway – Vocals (tracks 2-3)
Kenny Hicks – Vocals, credited as "operatic tenor" (track 3)
Craig J "The Count" – Percussion (track 3)
Munyungo Jackson – Percussion (track 4)
Joey Kibble – background vocals (track 9)
Mark Kibble – background vocals (track 9)
Eartha Kitt – Vocal sample (track 1)
Gregoire Maret – Harmonica (tracks 4, 8, 10)
Lucky Peterson – Guitar (track 6)
Kirk Whalum – Tenor saxophone, Soloist (track 5, 7)
Mocean Worker – Effects, credited as "DJ Efx" (track 5, 7, 13)

Production
Adam Dorn  – Engineer
Dropper  – Engineer
Jack Frisch  – Art Direction, Design, Photography
Harold Goode  – Executive Producer
Bibi Green  – Production Coordination
Kumiko Higo  – Photography
Takamasa Honda  – Engineer, Assistant Engineer, Mixing, Technical Supervisor
Goh Hotoda  – Mixing
Dave Huston  – Assistant Engineer
David Isaac  – Producer, Engineer, Mixing
Reuben Jackson  – Liner Notes
Mark Kibble – Engineer
Kaori Kinoshita  – Assistant Engineer
Hank Martin  – Executive Producer
Zach McNees  – Assistant Engineer
Gretchen ONeal  – Coordination
Bryan Russell  – Assistant Engineer
Louie Teran  – Mastering
Dennis Thompson  – Engineer, Mixing

References

2005 albums
Marcus Miller albums
Albums produced by Marcus Miller
E1 Music albums